Lee David (born March 3, 1994) is a South Korean actor. He is best known for his supporting roles in Poetry, The Front Line, and Itaewon Class. He has also had starring roles in Romance Joe and Pluto.

Personal life 
Lee enlisted in the military on October 18, 2021, posting a picture on Instagram.

Filmography

Film

Television series

Music video

Awards and nominations

References

External links
 
 
 
 
 Lee David at Saram Entertainment
Lee David on Instagram

21st-century South Korean male actors
South Korean male child actors
South Korean male television actors
South Korean male film actors
South Korean male web series actors
1994 births
Living people
People from Incheon